Brüngger is a Swiss surname. Notable people with the surname include:

Nico Brüngger (born 1988), Swiss cyclist
Renata Jungo Brüngger (born 1961), Swiss lawyer

Swiss-German surnames